Tylopilus perplexus is a bolete fungus of the genus Tylopilus. Described as new to science in 1994 by Scottish mycologist Roy Watling, it is found in Zambia, where it grows on the ground in relic miombo woodland.

References

External links
 

perplexus
Fungi described in 1994
Fungi of Africa